The Bury St Edmunds witch trials were a series of trials conducted intermittently between the years 1599 and 1694 in the town of Bury St Edmunds in Suffolk, England.

Two specific trials in 1645 and 1662 became historically well known. The 1645 trial "facilitated" by the Witchfinder General saw 18 people executed in one day. The judgment by the future Lord Chief Justice of England and Wales, Sir Matthew Hale in the 1662 trial acted as a powerful influence on the continuing persecution of witches in England and similar persecutions in the American Colonies.

Jurisdiction
As well as being the seat of county assizes, Bury St Edmunds had been a site for both piepowder courts and court assizes, the latter since the Abbey was given a  Liberty, namely the Liberty of St Edmund.
For the purposes of civil government the town and the remainder (or "body") of the county were quite distinct, each providing a separate grand jury to the assizes.

Early trials
The first recorded account of a witch trial at Bury St Edmunds Suffolk was of one held in 1599 when Jone Jordan of Shadbrook (Stradbroke) and Joane Nayler were tried, but there is no record of the charges or verdicts. In the same year, Oliffe Bartham of Shadbrook was executed, for "sending three toads to destroy the rest (sleep) of Joan Jordan".

The 1645 trial
The trial was instigated by Matthew Hopkins, the self-proclaimed Witchfinder General, and conducted at a special court under John Godbolt. There was much to keep the minds of Parliamentarians busy at this time with the Royalist Army heading towards Cambridgeshire, but concern about the events unfolding were being voiced. A report was carried to the Parliament that the witch-hunters were extracting confessions through torture; therefore, a special commission of oyer and terminer was formed, to ensure a fair trial. On 27 August 1645, no fewer than 18 people were executed by hanging at Bury St Edmunds. 16 of the 18 people executed that day were women. The executed were:
Anne Alderman, Rebecca Morris and Mary Bacon of Chattisham
Mary Clowes of Yoxford
Sarah Spindler, Jane Linstead, Thomas Everard (cooper) and his wife Mary Everard of Halesworth
Mary Fuller of Combs, near Stowmarket
John Lowes, Vicar of Brandeston
Susan Manners, Jane Rivet and Mary Skipper of Copdock, near Ipswich
Mary Smith of Great Glemham
Margery Sparham of Mendham
Katherine Tooly of Westleton.
Anne Leech and Anne Wright, origin unknown.

It has been estimated that all of the English witch trials between the early 15th and early 18th centuries resulted in fewer than 500 executions; in which case this one trial, with its 18 executions, accounted for 3.6% of the total.

According to John Stearn(e) known at various times as the witch–hunter, and "witch pricker", associate to Matthew Hopkins, in his book A Confirmation and Discovery of Witchcraft there were one hundred and twenty others in gaol awaiting trial, of these 17 were men. Thomas Ady in 1656 wrote of "about a hundred", though others record "almost 200". Following a three-week adjournment made necessary by the advancing King's Army, the second sitting of the court resulted in 68 other "condemnations"; though reports say – "mass executions of sixty or seventy witches".
Both Hopkins and Stearne treated the search for, and trials of witches as military campaigns, as shown in their choice of language in both seeking support for and reporting their endeavours. After the trial and execution the
Moderate Intelligencer, a parliamentary paper published during the English Civil War, in an editorial of 4–11 September 1645, expressed unease with the affairs in Bury:

1655 Trial
Another recorded witch trial in Bury St Edmunds was in 1655 when a mother and daughter by the name of Boram were tried and said to have been hanged.

The 1662 trial
...especially in these times, wherein things of this nature are so much controverted, and that by persons of much learning on both sides.

Decrying the controversial ("so much controverted") nature of views on witchcraft and witch-phobia, even during the 17th century, the original pamphlet about the proceedings in 1662 A Tryal of Witches was only printed anonymously, and not until twenty years later. The original writer is described as having sat in on the proceedings and taken an account "for his own satisfaction" before passing it to another anonymous "private Gentleman's hands in the country" who later passed it to the anonymous publisher of the work who printed it 1682. Thus the three different people in this chain all chose to remain anonymous.

The trial began on 10 March 1662, when two elderly widows, Rose Cullender and Amy Duny (or Deny or Denny), living in Lowestoft, were accused of witchcraft by their neighbours and faced 13 charges of the bewitching of several young children between the ages of a few months to 18 years old, resulting in one death. They may have been aware of each other, inhabiting a small town, but Cullender was from a property-owning family, whilst Denny was the widow of a labourer. The charge of witchcraft was first brought against them by a Lowestoft merchant, Samuel Pacy, who claimed that both women had separately called at his house to purchase herring, but had been upset to be turned away. Pacy accused the women of causing the afflictions of his two daughters, Elizabeth and Deborah, age eleven and nine respectively. Pacy's sister Margaret also testified against the women. They were tried at the Assize held in Bury St Edmunds under the auspices of the 1603 Witchcraft Act, by a well-respected judge Sir Matthew Hale, Lord Chief Baron of the Exchequer.

Thomas Browne attended the trial and was called upon to give his opinion. His opinion was that the accused persons were bewitched and he related similar events that had recently occurred in Denmark. These views may have influenced the jury to bring a guilty verdict . He had expressed his belief in the existence of witches twenty years earlier, and that only: "they that doubt of these, do not only deny them, but spirits; and are obliquely, and upon consequence a sort not of infidels, but atheists" in his work Religio Medici, published in 1643:
... how so many learned heads should so far forget their metaphysics, and destroy the ladder and scale of creatures, as to question the existence of spirits: for my part, I have ever believed, and do now know, that there are witches;

According to the pamphlet, the judge instructed the jury they only "had two things to enquire after. First, whether or no these children were bewitched?  Secondly, whether the prisoners at the bar were guilty of it?" They were convicted on Thursday March 13, 1662 (Julian) and executed four days later at Bury St Edmunds on 17 March 1662.

The 1682 pamphlet A Tryal of Witches erroneously dates the trial as March 1664, both on the front page and introduction. Original documents in the Public Record Office and other contemporary records clearly states it took place in the 14th year of the reign of Charles II (30 January 1662 to 29 January 1663).

A model for Salem
This case became a model for, and was referenced in, the Salem Witch Trials in Massachusetts. Clergyman Cotton Mather in a book promoting the on-going trials in 1692  The Wonders of the Invisible World, specifically draws attention to the Suffolk trial: 
We may see the witchcrafts here most exactly resemble the witchcrafts there;... And it is here the rather mentioned, because it was a trial much considered by the judges of New England . 

Cotton Mather's father, Clergyman Increase Mather was President of Harvard College during the trials at Salem (he was awarded Harvard's first doctorate during this time) and he also mentions the trials at Bury as a precedent in a work dated 3 October 1692.

Clergyman John Hale, writing five years after the Salem trials, notes that the Salem area clergy and judges consulted and referenced seven different works including an earlier (1689) work by Cotton Mather Memorable Providences and Sir Matthew Hale's description of the Suffolk trials A Tryal of Witches.

Hutchinson's Defense of the Accused
In a book published in 1718, Francis Hutchinson, a minister at the parish in Bury St Edmunds, re-visits these trials in taking up the cause of the accused. Hutchinson also includes discussion of the trials at Salem in 1692, stating that he relies on a work that shares a similar sentiment by Robert Calef. (Calef had been born and raised in Stanstead, England, only 11 miles south of Bury, before emigrating to Boston, Massachusetts. Hutchinson doesn't mention this about Calef and it is unclear if he was aware of it.)

An example of Hutchinson's clear-eyed defence can be found in his treatment of the case against Amy Duny. Hutchinson notes that she had every right to scold the man who had, afterall, run into the corner of her house with a cart:

And I ask, is it not likely there was either a jadish horse or a silly driver that belonged to that cart? For before the poor woman had spoken to them that cart could not keep the road but ran against her house. And without any witchcraft might not the same jadish horse or bad driver make it go wrong afterward as well as before? But this witness adds that the cart was set fast in a Gate-head, though it did not not touch the posts, as far as they could perceive. But if it did not touch the posts what made them cut the post down? Will cutting down a post that is not touched dissolve a charm? But they make themselves ridiculous, that they might lay blame upon this poor woman.

Last trial
The last was in 1694 when Lord Chief Justice Sir John Holt, "who did more than any other man in English history to end the prosecution of witches", forced the acquittal of Mother Munnings' of Hartis (Hartest) on charges of prognostications causing death. The chief charge was 17 years old, the second brought by a man on his way home from an alehouse. Sir John "so well directed the jury that she was acquitted".

See also
Witch trials in the early modern period
Francis Hutchinson
Robert Calef
Letter from Cotton Mather to William Stoughton September 2, 1692
Cambridge Association of Ministers

References
Notes

Bibliography

Further reading
 Gaskill, Malcolm, Witchfinders: A Seventeenth-Century English Tragedy. Harvard University Press: 2005. 
Geis, Gilbert, and Bunn, Ivan, A Trial of Witches: A Seventeenth-century Witchcraft Prosecution. Routledge: London & New York, 1997. 
Jensen Gary F., The Path of the Devil: Early Modern Witch Hunts. Rowman & Littlefield 2006 Lanham 
Notestein, Wallace, A History of Witchcraft in England from 1558 to 1718 Kessinger Publishing: U.S.A. 2003 
Discovery of the Beldam Witch Trials: The Examinations, Confessions and Information Taken; in 1645 Essex. USA, 2016.

External links
A Sample Case: The Trial at St. Bury Edmunds
 Sir John Holt (1642–1710): a biographical sketch, with especial reference to his witchcraft trials

Salem witch trials
1645 in law
1662 in law
17th-century trials
Bury St Edmunds
17th century in Suffolk
1645 in England
1662 in England
History of Suffolk
Legal history of England
Witch trials in England
1645 crimes in Europe 
1662 crimes in Europe